Nick Celis (born 24 November 1988) is a Belgian basketball player for Kangoeroes Basket Mechelen and the Belgian 3x3 national team.

He represented Belgium at the 2020 Summer Olympics.

References

External links
 

1988 births
Living people
3x3 basketball players at the 2020 Summer Olympics
Belgian men's basketball players
Belgian men's 3x3 basketball players
Forwards (basketball)
Guards (basketball)
Kangoeroes Basket Mechelen players
Olympic 3x3 basketball players of Belgium
Sportspeople from Antwerp